Sean McMorrow (born January 19, 1982) is a Canadian professional ice hockey winger. He currently plays semi-professionally for the Jonquière Marquis of the LNAH. Originally selected by the Buffalo Sabres in the 2000 NHL Entry Draft, McMorrow played in 1 NHL game with the Sabres in the 2002–03 season. He was born in Vancouver, British Columbia, but grew up in Scarborough, Ontario.

Playing career
As a youth, McMorrow played in the 1996 Quebec International Pee-Wee Hockey Tournament with a minor ice hockey team from Wexford, Toronto.

McMorrow was drafted by the Buffalo Sabres in the 8th round, 258th overall in the 2000 NHL Entry Draft from the Ontario Hockey League. He made his NHL debut for the Sabres in the 2002–03 NHL season on March 22, 2003 against the Toronto Maple Leafs, McMorrow spent the rest of his time with the Sabres' affiliate, the Rochester Americans. McMorrow was not re-signed by the Buffalo Sabres after the 2005–06 season, and subsequently signed with the Chicago Wolves of the AHL. Due to a lack of playing time, McMorrow left the Wolves in 2006 to play for Saint-Hyacinthe Top Design a semiprofessional hockey team in Quebec's LNAH.

McMorrow signed a professional try-out contract with the Rockford IceHogs of the AHL on October 22, 2008, playing for them in the 2008-09 Season. 

McMorrow would then go on to sign a contract to play for the Belfast Giants of the Elite Ice Hockey League for the 2009–10 Season.

It was announced that McMorrow would return to the EIHL for the 2010–11 season, to play for expansion team, Dundee Stars. On November 5, 2010, it was announced that McMorrow had left the Dundee Stars by mutual consent signing for the LNAH's Saguenay Marquis shortly afterwards.

Personal
During his tenure in the EIHL, McMorrow appeared on season 14 episode 4 of Top Gear as a Belfast ice hockey player supposedly being hit by Jeremy Clarkson in a Renault Twingo as the presenter was driving it around the Belfast Odyssey ice during a scrimmage.

Career statistics

References

External links 

Official Sean McMorrow Website

1982 births
Living people
Belfast Giants players
Black Canadian ice hockey players
Buffalo Sabres draft picks
Buffalo Sabres players
Canadian ice hockey right wingers
Dundee Stars players
Kingston Frontenacs players
Kitchener Rangers players
London Knights players
Mississauga IceDogs players
Oshawa Generals players
Rochester Americans players
Rockford IceHogs (AHL) players
Sarnia Sting players
Sportspeople from Scarborough, Toronto
Ice hockey people from Toronto
Ice hockey people from Vancouver
Canadian expatriate ice hockey players in Northern Ireland
Canadian expatriate ice hockey players in Scotland
Canadian expatriate ice hockey players in the United States